Torrents-Time is a browser plugin that allows websites to have the same functionality as the popular Popcorn Time program, without requiring the client to download an application. Released 2 February 2016, sites such as The Pirate Bay and the now defunct KickassTorrents others supported the plugin within days, allowing for in-browser streaming of popular videos. Only two weeks into its history it was attacked by anti-piracy groups on a number of grounds. The security of the plugin has been questioned, especially its reliance on cross-origin resource sharing and parts of its javascript implementation which could end up compromising a target computer and stealing information about the source. However, the Torrents-Time team claims these fears are exaggerations and based "half-truths".

See also 
 Butter Project

References 

Peer-to-peer file sharing